The Mess Creek Escarpment is an escarpment in northwestern British Columbia, Canada, located on the east side of Mess Creek below Mess Lake and southeast of Telegraph Creek. It forms the central-western flank of the Mount Edziza volcanic complex, exposing several layers of black columnar basaltic lava flows with distal rock fragments and pyroclastic rock deposits.

The Mess Creek Escarpment was named on January 2, 1980, by the Geological Survey of Canada in associated with Mess Creek.

See also
Geography of British Columbia
Geology of British Columbia
Volcanism of Canada
Volcanism of Western Canada

References

Escarpments of Canada
Geology of British Columbia
Landforms of British Columbia